Andrew Emil Woehr (February 4, 1896 – July 24, 1990) was a professional baseball player. He played one full season (1924) and part of another (1923) in Major League Baseball. He played a total of 63 games for the Philadelphia Phillies, primarily as a third baseman.

External links

Major League Baseball third basemen
Philadelphia Phillies players
Grand Rapids Joshers players
Bloomington Bloomers players
Ludington Mariners players
Williamsport Billies players
Beaumont Exporters players
Shreveport Sports players
Baseball players from Indiana
1896 births
1990 deaths